Francis W. Wynkoop (January 24, 1902 – September 2, 1978), was an American architect, known for building educational school buildings in Pacific Grove and San Carlos, and oceanfront homes in Carmel Point at the southern city limits of Carmel-by-the-Sea, California. One of them is the noted Butterfly House on Scenic Drive.

Early life 

Wynkoop was born on January 24, 1902, in Denver, Colorado. His father was Francis Murray Wynkoop (1869-1954) and mother was Leona Mehan (1880-1951). His grandfather was Edward W. Wynkoop (1836-1891), one of the founders of the city of Denver, Colorado. Wynkoop Street in Denver is named after him. In 1904, when Wynkoop was two years old, his parents moved from Albuquerque, New Mexico to Long Beach, California. In 1910, he lived with his parents in Vallejo, California. By 1920, when he was 17 years old, he was living with his family in Pomona, California.

Professional background

In early 1921, Wynkoop opened an office on 1261 American Avenue, in Long Beach and was connected with D. H. Archibald, a city contractor and builder. In December 1921, he completed the design for two $6,000 brick one-story four family apartment buildings at 620 New York street. The buildings would house eight families.

On July 27, 1924, Wynkoop won second place out of fifty-two plans submitted in the McGrath & Selover contest under the direction of the Long Beach Architectural Association. The plan he submitted provided the design of a small two-bedroom one bath Spanish style home. At this time Wynkoop moved his office to the entire eighth floor of the Kress building (listed among the Long Beach historic landmarks).

About 1930, Wynkoop married Adabelle May Roberts (1899-1953) in California. They had one son and one daughter. In 1931, during the Great Depression in the United States, Wynkoop moved with his wife to Seattle, Washington where he was a draftsman at the Metropolitan Building Company. Dudley Francis Wynkoop (1931-2012) was born on September 8, 1931.

In 1935, Wynkoop and his family moved to Fresno, California. On February 8, 1936, Nancy Wynkoop (1936-1975) was born in Fresno. In 1937, Wynkoop relocated his family to Bakersfield, California where he became the local architect with the Adams and Wynkoop firm. His office was at the Haberfeld building where he worked on nine Kern County schools and war housing in Lerdo, California. Architect Eugene Kinn Choy worked for Wynkoop in Bakersfield.

Wynkoop divorced Adabelle May Roberts in Reno, Nevada in October 1944 and married Virginia Rosemary Floyd-Tracy (1918-1998) in Carson City, Nevada. They had two children together, Jay and Thor Wynkoop. By 1945, Wynkoop was principal for the Frank Wynkoop and Associates, Architects in San Francisco.

Carmel-by-the-Sea
Wynkoop and his family moved to Carmel-by-the-Sea, California in the early 1950s. His mother, Leona, died soon after, on December 13, 1951 at a San Bernardino, California hospital.

On January 1951, Wynkoop designed a 800 student capacity scale model for the San Carlos-Belmont high school, at an estimated cost of $1,225,000.

On January 25, 1952, Wynkoop placed an ad in the Carmel Pine Cone advertising his architectural office at Dolores Street at 7th Avenue in Carmel-by-the-Sea, with 18 employees working for him. He built the Pacific Grove High School and the San Carlos High School. As a school planning specialist, he served on the Educational Advisory Boards of Great Britain and Australia. Models of his architectural plans were on exhibition in Boston, St. Louis, and Los Angeles.

Butterfly House

Wynkoop designed two houses on the Carmel Point coastline. The Butterfly House was the first one, at 26320 Scenic Road. Construction began in 1951 and was completed in 1952.

He received national attention in numerous newspapers and magazines such as The Californian in 1952, and the National Geographic in 1954 Wynkoop lived in the house with his wife and children until the death of Adabelle in 1953 and the death of his father in 1954 forced him to sell the $135,000 house in 1955 to Stephen Kahn for only $15,000.

Seaburst House

Wynkoop designed and built a second home on Carmel Point in 1953 called The Seaburst House, also called the Henry Johnson House. It is a mid-century modern Expressionist-style house at 26200 Scenic Road, between the Kuster's house and the Jeffer's house. The design was influenced by Frank Lloyd Wright's organic architecture style.

On March 31, 1953, the Monterey Herald wrote an article with the title: Workman Begin Modernization Of Landmark on Carmel Point. The property was once the Col. Dutton's House, built in ca. 1919. It was referred to as "The Warehouse," and "The Castle" by his neighbor Robinson Jeffers. It was a stone "shoebox" size house with large iron doors to the west of the "Sea Road," (Scenic Road) which at the time was a dirt road that was marked by driftwood stakes on both sides of the road.

Other designs

In January 1954, Wynkoop designed the Morro Bay Union elementary school two-wing addition with eight classrooms at a cost of $140,367.

On August 7, 1955, at age 53, Wynkoop married his third wife, Betty Attwater (1916-1981), age 39, in Monterey, California. After selling the Butterfly House in 1955, Wynkoop with his wife and daughter, Nancy, had an office at his residence on Monte Verde Street and 2nd Avenue in Carmel.

In April 1955, Wynkoop designed four six-sided Hexagon buildings for the Atwater, Merced County, Elementary School District. In 1957, Wynkoop designed a school campus and buildings covered by a single roof. The roof covered  of ground. Supporting arches were concrete, and the roof is a series of steel cables and vermiculite concrete that form an umbrella. The estimated cost was $700,000.

Hawaii
In 1959, the family moved to La Puente, California. Wynkoop and Betty then moved to Honolulu, Hawaii between 1972 and 1974. In 1975, Wynkoop designed the Haikue Woods property in Honolulu.

Death
Wynkoop died on September 2, 1978, in Honolulu, Hawaii, at the age of 76. His wife Betty, died on July 19, 1981 in Honolulu.

Buildings and other works

See also
 Timeline of Carmel-by-the-Sea, California

References

External links

 Ned Wynkoop and the lonely road from Sand Creek

1902 births
1978 deaths
People from California
People from Denver
People from Carmel-by-the-Sea, California